Proper Cowboy is the fourth album released by Diego's Umbrella, released in July 2012.

Proper Cowboy marks the band's first time collaboration with San Francisco producers The Rondo Brothers (MC Lars, Foster the People), as well as their second release under the Ninth Street Opus record label. The union has resulted in a new spin on the familiar sound that has been referred to as a "futuristic Spaghetti-Western soundtrack" that features a cover of 1972 Sonny and Cher song, "A Cowboy's Work Is Never Done". Additionally, "Bulletproof Shine" marks a collaboration with Angelo Moore (leader of Fishbone), who adds his vocals and theremin to the track.

Julia R. DeStefano of Performer Magazine says of the album that it "easily places them in the 'best kept secret-turned next big thing' category." Fun Fun Fun Media said, "Diego’s Umbrella is like Gogol Bordello meets Queen."

Track listing
All song written, performed and arranged by Diego's Umbrella.

Personnel
 Tyson Maulhardt - Electric Guitar, Vocals
 Vaughn Lindstrom - Acoustic Guitar, Vocals
 Ben Leon - Vocals, Electric Guitar, Percussion
 Jason Kleinberg - Violin, Vocals, Accordion
 Jake Wood - Drums

Additional personnel
 Angelo Moore - Theremin, Vox
 Brahm Sheray - Bass (Richardson, Bulletproof Shine, Amsterdam, Big Star)
 Bob Menacho - Bass (Tightrope, Moneymaker)
 Kevin Blair - Bass (Downtown, Thrash)
 Jim Greer - Piano, Synthesizer, Accordion, Strings, Drum
 Brandon Arnovick - Beats
 Olga Kapustina - Asst. Engineering (Moneymaker), Additional Strings (Downtown)

Additional singers
 Mike Choinard
 Katie Bishop
 Marta Skeen
 Larry May
 Alisa Saario
 Noel Garcia
 Christine Kemp
 Estee Schwartz
 Matthew Smith
 Olga Kapustina

Production
 Produced and Mixed by The Rondo Brothers
 Engineered by Calvin Turnbull and The Rondo Brothers
 Mastered by The Rondo Brothers
 Artwork by Kelsey Brookes
 Art Photography by Roy Porello

References

2012 albums
Diego's Umbrella albums